Iraq have appeared once in the FIFA World Cup which was in 1986. They ended up last place in their group with zero points, scoring only one goal.

FIFA World Cup record

Iraq at Mexico 1986

Paraguay vs Iraq
This match caused controversy as the referee, Edwin Picon-Ackong, blew the whistle for half time a split-second before Iraq striker Ahmed Radhi's header hit the back of the net, and the goal was ruled out. Picon-Ackong was criticised for blowing the whistle when Iraq had a significant goalscoring opportunity.

Iraq vs Belgium

Iraq vs Mexico

Record players
There are seven players who have been fielded on all three occasions. Five of them played every single minute, while Abdul-Rahim Hamed Aufi came on as a substitute every single time, replacing fellow record holder Hashim in the last match.

Top goalscorers

The only Iraqi goal at the FIFA World Cup was scored by Ahmed Radhi in their match against Belgium.

References

External links
 Iraqi Football Website
 Iraq at the 1986 World Cup
 History of Iraq National Team

 
Countries at the FIFA World Cup
FIFA